Robert Herbert "Bert" Lacey (12 January 1900 – 2 November 1984) was an Australian politician.

Life and career 
Born in Maryborough, Victoria, Lacey was educated at state schools and then at Wendouree Agricultural College in Ballarat. He became a construction worker, bush worker and miner, and served in the military in 1918. Having moved to Tasmania, he was an organiser of the state's Australian Workers' Union 1938–1946 and Secretary of the Tasmanian Labor Party 1947–1965.

In January 1959, he was elected in a countback as Labor member for Denison in the Tasmanian House of Assembly, replacing Alfred White who had been appointed Agent-General in London. The parliament was prorogued before Lacey took his seat in the chamber, and he was defeated at the state election in May that year.

In 1964, Lacey was elected to the Australian Senate as a Labor Senator for Tasmania. He held the seat until his defeat in 1970, effectively by independent Michael Townley.

Lacey died in 1984.

References 

Australian Labor Party members of the Parliament of Australia
Members of the Australian Senate for Tasmania
Members of the Australian Senate
Members of the Tasmanian House of Assembly
1900 births
1984 deaths
20th-century Australian politicians